Hope! – Das Obama Musical (English: Hope! - The Obama Musical) is a German musical inspired by the personal life and career of U.S. President Barack Obama, from his time in Chicago, Illinois, until the 2008 U.S. presidential election.  The show premiered on January 17, 2010, at Frankfurt's Jahrhunderthalle, a 2,000-seat venue.  It is believed to be the first stage production portraying the life of a U.S. president while he is still serving in office.

References

External links 
 

2010 musicals
Works about Barack Obama
Barack Obama 2008 presidential campaign
Chicago in fiction
Music in Frankfurt
German musicals
Hillary Clinton 2008 presidential campaign
John McCain 2008 presidential campaign
Musicals inspired by real-life events
2008 United States presidential election in popular culture